Alfredo Villegas Arreola (born 12 January 1951) is a Mexican politician affiliated with the Institutional Revolutionary Party.  he served as Deputy of the LV, LVII, LIX and LXI Legislatures of the Mexican Congress as a plurinominal representative.

References

1951 births
Living people
People from Sinaloa
Members of the Chamber of Deputies (Mexico)
Institutional Revolutionary Party politicians
21st-century Mexican politicians
Deputies of the LXI Legislature of Mexico